Wireless Telegraphy Act is (with its variations) a stock short title used for legislation in the Republic of Ireland, South Africa and the United Kingdom relating to wireless telegraphy.

The Wireless Telegraphy Acts are laws regulating radio communications in the United Kingdom.

Wireless telegraphy as a concept is defined in British law as "the sending of electro-magnetic energy over paths not provided by a material substance."

The term telegraphy, although best known in relation to the electric telegraph, relates to the sending of messages over long-distances. Wireless telegraphy is differentiated from electrical telegraphy in that the messages are transmitted via electromagnetic means (light or radio) rather than via a physical electrical cable connection.

The current (2018) supervisor of the UK's electromagnetic spectrum is the communications regulator, Ofcom.

List

Cape Colony (South Africa)
The Electric Telegraphs Amendment Act 1902 (required wireless masts to be licensed)

Ireland
The Wireless Telegraphy Act 1904 and 1906 (pre-independence acts repealed in 1926)
The Wireless Telegraphy Act 1926  (the principal Act)
The Wireless Telegraphy Act 1956   (concerned with use of radios in vehicles)
The Broadcasting Authority Act 1960  (established RTÉ and makes amendments to the 1926 Act in relation to television and interference)
The Broadcasting offences Act 1968  (banned offshore pirate radio stations-none of which existed at the time)
The Wireless Telegraphy Act 1972  (concerned mainly with TV receiver licensing)
The Broadcasting Authority (Amendment) Act 1976  (amendments concerning cable TV)
The Broadcasting And Wireless Telegraphy Act 1988  (concerned mainly with unlicensed broadcasting)
The Broadcasting Act 1990  (amendments concerning cable TV and unauthorised decoding or interception of broadcast services)
The Broadcasting Act 2009

United Kingdom
The Wireless Telegraphy Act 1904 (subsequently repealed)
The Wireless Telegraphy Act 1906 (subsequently repealed)
The Wireless Telegraphy Act 1924 (subsequently repealed)
The Wireless Telegraphy Act 1949 c. 54 (subsequently repealed)
The Marine etc. Broadcasting (Offences) Act 1967 c.41 (banned offshore pirate radio stations, subsequently repealed)
The Wireless Telegraphy Act 1967 c. 72
The Telecommunications Act 1984 (made amendments to the 1949 Act)
The Broadcasting Act 1990 (made extensive amendments to the 1949 and 1967 Acts)
The Broadcasting Act 1996
The Wireless Telegraphy Act 1998 c. 6 (introduced spectrum pricing)
The Office of Communications Act 2002 (created Ofcom)
The Communications Act 2003 (provided for new activities relating to spectrum pricing)
The Wireless Telegraphy Act 2006 (c 36)

See also
List of short titles

Lists of legislation by short title
Laws in the United Kingdom
Radio in the United Kingdom
Telecommunications in the United Kingdom
Telecommunications law
Telegraphy